The committees of the 3rd Supreme People's Assembly (SPA) were elected by the 1st Session of the aforementioned body on 23 October 1962. It was replaced on 16 December 1967 by the committees of the 4th Supreme People's Assembly.

Committees

Bills

Budget

Credentials

Foreign Affairs

References

Citations

Bibliography
Books:
 

3rd Supreme People's Assembly
1962 establishments in North Korea
1967 disestablishments in North Korea